The Isle of Man Purchase Act 1765 (5 Geo. 3 c. 26), also known as the Act of Revestment, purchased the feudal rights of the Dukes of Atholl as Lords of Man over the Isle of Man, and revested them into the British Crown.

The Act gave effect to an earlier contract between Charlotte, Duchess of Atholl, and the Government of the Kingdom of Great Britain, represented by HM Treasury, to sell the Atholls' feudal rights over the Island to the Crown for a sum of £70,000. The authority to conclude a contract for the purchase was given under a private Act of Parliament in 1726, but as an Act of Parliament of 1609 had conferred the feudal rights over the island upon the Atholls, primary legislation was required to terminate those rights.

The Act came into force upon the granting of royal assent on 10 May 1765. The payment to the Duchess of Atholl was to be made no later than 1 June 1765.

The Act did not go as far as had been proposed: for a period there had been plans to merge the Isle of Man into the English county of Cumberland. This had met with fierce resistance from the inhabitants, led by the then Speaker of the House of Keys, Sir George Moore.

The long title of the Act was "An Act for carrying into Execution a Contract, made pursuant to the Act of Parliament of the 12th of his late Majesty King George 1st, between the Commissioners of his Majesty’s Treasury and the Duke and Duchess of Atholl, the proprietors of the Isle of Man, and their Trustees, for the purchase of the said Island and its dependencies, under certain exceptions therein particularly mentioned."

Having taken effect and therefore being effectively "spent", the Act was finally repealed by the Statute Law (Repeals) Act 1976.

Subsequent rights sold
Under the Isle of Man Purchase Act, the Atholls still retained their manorial rights, the patronage of the bishopric, and certain other perquisites.

These were sold in 1828 for the sum of £417,144 (over £20,000,000 in modern terms). This was accomplished by two Private Acts of Parliament:

 "An Act empowering the Lords of the Treasury to Purchase all the Manorial Rights of the Duke of Atholl in the Isle of Man" [c. 34] 10 June 1824
 "An Act to empower the Commissioners of His Majesty’s Treasury to purchase a certain Annuity in respect of Duties and Customs levied in the Isle of Man, and any reserved sovereign rights in the said Island belonging to John Duke of Atholl" [c. 34] 10 June 1825

See also
History of the Isle of Man – Revestment

References

Government of the Isle of Man
Manx law
Great Britain Acts of Parliament 1765
Repealed Great Britain Acts of Parliament